Frédéric Ferreira Maciel (born 15 March 1994) is a Portuguese professional footballer who plays for S.C.U. Torreense as a right winger.

Club career
Born in Grenoble, France of Portuguese descent, Maciel joined FC Porto's academy at the age of 16. He made his senior debut with the reserves, going on to spend several seasons in the Segunda Liga; in 2014–15, he scored a squad-best 13 goals in 43 games to help to a 13th-place finish.

On 13 July 2015, Maciel signed a three-year deal with Royal Mouscron-Péruwelz which was to be initially a one-year loan with option to buy. He was sparingly used during the campaign, with the side narrowly avoiding relegation from the Belgian First Division A.

Maciel returned to his country of adoption in summer 2016, agreeing to a two-year contract at Moreirense FC. His Primeira Liga debut occurred on 29 October, when he came on as a 62nd-minute substitute for Daniel Podence in a 2–1 away win against C.D. Tondela. In the final game of the season, he scored his only league goal in a 3–1 home victory over former club Porto. Though he was not involved in the final at all, he played his part in their conquest of the Taça da Liga by scoring the only goal of the second-round defeat of G.D. Estoril-Praia at the Parque de Jogos Comendador Joaquim de Almeida Freitas. On 19 November 2017, in the fourth round of the Taça de Portugal, he added two more in a 5–2 win over F.C. Felgueiras 1932 at the same venue.

On 10 January 2018, Maciel moved across the second division to Gil Vicente F.C. on a 2-year deal. He made ten starts as the team from Barcelos suffered relegation, and scored in a 2–1 loss at C.D. Santa Clara on 25 February; injury cost him the entire 2018–19, and new manager Vítor Oliveira informed him that he was not in his plans for the club now restored to the top flight.

On 2 September 2019, free agent Maciel joined Varzim S.C. on a one-year contract.

Honours
Moreirense
Taça da Liga: 2016–17

References

External links

1994 births
Living people
French people of Portuguese descent
Sportspeople from Grenoble
Portuguese footballers
Footballers from Auvergne-Rhône-Alpes
Association football wingers
Primeira Liga players
Liga Portugal 2 players
Campeonato de Portugal (league) players
Padroense F.C. players
FC Porto B players
Moreirense F.C. players
Gil Vicente F.C. players
Varzim S.C. players
Lusitânia F.C. players
S.C.U. Torreense players
Belgian Pro League players
Royal Excel Mouscron players
Portugal youth international footballers
Portuguese expatriate footballers
Expatriate footballers in Belgium
Portuguese expatriate sportspeople in Belgium